The 2004–05 season was the seventh season in the existence of U.C. AlbinoLeffe and the club's second consecutive season in the second division of Italian football. In addition to the domestic league, AlbinoLeffe participated in this season's edition of the Coppa Italia.

Players

First-team squad

Transfers

In

Out

Pre-season and friendlies

Competitions

Overall record

Serie B

League table

Results summary

Results by round

Matches

Source:

Coppa Italia

Group B

References

U.C. AlbinoLeffe seasons
AlbinoLeffe